In the 2004 Indian general election for Madhya Pradesh polls were held for 29 seats in the state. The result was a major victory for the Bharatiya Janata Party (BJP)  which won 25 seats. The remaining 4 seats were won by Indian National Congress (INC).

List of winners

External links
Election Commission of India

2004
2004
2004 Indian general election by state or union territory